Rythu Seamanvaya Samithi (RSS) also Farmers’ Coordination Committee is an agriculture cooperative set up by the Government of Telangana to transform agricultural activity, development and farmer welfare in the state. The farmer investment support scheme, Rythu bandhu scheme is to be distributed through this committees at the village level. The Chairman of
Rythu Samanvaya Samithi is Palla Rajeshwar Reddy MLC, Telangana Legislative Council.

History
The committees were announced at by the Chief Minister of Telangana, K. Chandrashekhar Rao. The committee came into existence on 26 February 2018. This scheme was held for farmers.

Organization
The organization with 1,61,000 farmer members in the state is formed. The Farmer Committees at different levels are:
 Village level - 15 members
 Mandal level - 24 members
 District level  - 24 members 
 State level - 42 members

The State level committee will have farmers, agricultural officers, scientists and experts as its members. An Agriculture Extension officer for every 5000 acres were appointed by the government.

The Corporation
The corporation was started as a non-profit organization. The duties and responsibilities for the members to play an active role in the agricultural operations; sowing the seeds, to selling the produce at Minimum Support Price (MSP).

Around 2,630 farmers’ association buildings will be constructed, one per every 5,000 acres, for the farmers to hold meetings, discuss and exchange views with other farmers. Mobile Soil Testing Labs would also operate from 137 Rythu Vedikas.

References

Government of Telangana
Agricultural cooperatives in India
2018 establishments in Telangana
Indian companies established in 2018